El Lay may refer to:

a song from the 1981 Los Illegals album Internal Exile
a song from the 1991 NOFX album Ribbed
a song from the 2011 Snoop Dogg album Doggumentary

See also 
LA (disambiguation)
Los Angeles